Piotr Romke (born 24 November 1959) is a Polish football midfielder.

References

1959 births
Living people
Polish footballers
Association football midfielders
Widzew Łódź players
Lech Poznań players
Ekstraklasa players
Polish expatriate footballers
Expatriate footballers in France
Polish expatriate sportspeople in France